Marvin W. Bursch (April 10, 1913 – May 1, 2000) was an American businessman and politician.

Bursch was born in Wood Lake, Yellow Medicine County, Minnesota and served in the United States Army during World War II. Bursch went to St. Olaf College in Northfield, Minnesota. He lived in Alexandria, Douglas County, Minnesota with his wife and family. Bursch was a travel agent. He served in the Minnesota Senate from 1967 to 1970.

References

1913 births
2000 deaths
People from Alexandria, Minnesota
People from Yellow Medicine County, Minnesota
Military personnel from Minnesota
Businesspeople from Minnesota
Minnesota state senators